Joon Gon Kim (March 28, 1925 – September 29, 2009) was a South Korean religious leader who was the founder of Korea Campus Crusade for Christ. During the Korean War, he lost both his father and his wife. In 1957, he went to the United States and attended Fuller Theological Seminary where he met Dr. Bill Bright, the founder of Campus Crusade for Christ International. In 1958, with collaboration and support from Bright, Kim established Korea Campus Crusade for Christ.  In 2004, with much fanfare, Kim retired and appointed Sung Min Park as his successor.

Kim was also a famous Korean Christian Evangelist. The story goes that during the springtime, as Kim's family was enjoying the day, an angry band of communist guerrillas invaded the village where Kim lived, killing everyone, including Kim's family. The guerrillas killed Kim's wife and father.  Kim was beaten and left for dead. Late, he awoke and fled to the safety of the mountains with his young daughter, Unhi Kim.

Kim learned from Scriptures to love his enemies and pray for those who persecuted him. The Spirit of God impressed upon him that he was to return to the village, seek out the communist leader who had led the attack and tell the communist leader, who killed Kim's wife and father, that he loved and forgave the communist leader, and to speak to the communist leader of God's love through Christ. This eventually happened, and the communist leader ended up kneeling in prayer with Kim and gave his life to Christ.  Within a short time, a number of other communists were converted to Christ and Kim helped build a church for these and other new Christians. Kim later became the pastor of one of the largest churches in South Korea, and founder of Korea Campus Crusade for Christ.

Death and legacy

On September 29, 2009 he died at the age of 85.

Notes

See also 
 Christianity in Korea
 List of people of Korean descent

References

External links
 Joon Gon Kim Naver

2009 deaths
Fuller Theological Seminary alumni
1925 births
People from South Jeolla Province